The Chief Minister of Madhya Pradesh is the chief executive of the Indian state of Madhya Pradesh. In accordance with the Constitution of India, the governor is a state's de jure head, but de facto executive authority rests with the chief minister. Following elections to the Madhya Pradesh Legislative Assembly, the state's governor usually invites the party (or coalition) with a majority of seats to form the government. The governor appoints the chief minister, whose council of ministers are collectively responsible to the assembly. Given the confidence of the assembly, the chief minister's term is for five years and is subject to no term limits.

Following Madhya Pradesh's reorganisation on 1 November 1956, 18 people served as its chief minister. Twelve of these belonged to the Indian National Congress, including the inaugural officeholder Ravishankar Shukla. The first non-Congress chief minister was Govind Narayan Singh who defected from the party and lead a Samyukta Vidhayak Dal government from 1967 to 1969. Digvijaya Singh of the Congress became the first officeholder to serve two full five-year terms. He was succeeded by Uma Bharti of the Bharatiya Janata Party, Madhya Pradesh's only woman chief minister. Shivraj Singh Chouhan of the Bharatiya Janata Party is the longest-serving and current incumbent.

Precursor states

Vindhya Pradesh (1948-1956) 
In 1948, the eastern regions of Central India Agency, became the Union of Baghelkhand and Bundelkhand States later renamed to Vindhya Pradesh in 1952. It was admitted into the union as a "Part B" state.

Madhya Bharat (1948-1956) 
In 1948, the western regions of Central India Agency and the Gwalior and Indore residencies, became the new state of Madhya Bharat. It was admitted into the union as a "Part B" state.

Bhopal State (1949-1956) 
On 30 April 1949, Sir Hamidullah Khan, the Nawab of Bhopal signed an Instrument of Accession to the Dominion of India. The state of Bhopal was taken over by the Union Government on 1 June 1949 and was declared a "Part C" state.

List of Chief Ministers of Madhya Pradesh
After the independence of India, the state of Madhya Pradesh was created in 1950 from the Central Provinces and Berar and the princely state of Makrai with Nagpur as the capital of the state. 

The States Reorganisation Act, 1956 merged the states of Madhya Bharat, Vindhya Pradesh, and Bhopal were merged into Madhya Pradesh and the Marathi-speaking southern region Vidarbha, which included Nagpur, was ceded to Bombay. In November 2000, as part of the Madhya Pradesh Reorganization Act the southeastern portion of the state was split off to form the new state of Chhattisgarh.

Timeline

}}

Footnotes

References

External links

 Chief Ministers of Madhya Pradesh

Madhya Pradesh
 
Chief Ministers